Gary Lagesse (born May 28, 1953) is a former athletic director, head softball coach, team advisor and current sporting goods sales representative. He served as the head softball coach for Thornwood High School from 1977 - 2006 winning State Championships in 1990, 1991 and 1998. He founded and operated the Illinois Outlaws travel softball program where he won the Amateur Softball Association 18U National Championship in 2008.  He holds a career record at the varsity level of 694 wins and 301 losses. He was inducted into the Illinois High School Association Coaches Hall of Fame in 2002.

Gary attended Beecher High School and Western Illinois University where he graduated with a degree in education in 1976. He currently resides in Beecher, Illinois and works at Lansing Sport Shop as store manager and advisor.

External links 
 http://icasoftball.org/coaching-awards/coaches-hall-of-fame/
 http://www.ihsa.org/Schools/SchoolDirectory.aspx?url=/data/school/s.htm

1953 births
High school softball in the United States
Western Illinois University alumni
Living people
People from Will County, Illinois